Events from the year 1832 in Ireland.

Events
23 May – following disorder at Castlepollard Fair in County Westmeath, at least seven men and two women are shot dead by the constabulary.
7 August – the Representation of the People (Ireland) Act, 1832, commonly called the Irish Reform Act 1832, introduces wide-ranging changes to the laws for elections to the Parliament of the United Kingdom, particularly in the Boroughs.

Arts and literature
January – Theatre Royal, Wexford opened.

Births
6 May – Margaret Anna Cusack, nun, writer and founder of the Sisters of St. Joseph of Peace (died 1899 in England).
10 May – William Russell Grace, businessman and first Roman Catholic mayor of New York (died 1904 in the United States).
September – John Byrne, soldier, recipient of the Victoria Cross for gallantry in 1854 at the Battle of Inkerman, Crimea (died 1879 in Wales).
30 September – Charlotte Riddell, née Cowan, novelist and editor (died 1906 in England).
11 November – Martin Murphy, civil engineer (died 1926 in Canada).
14 November – Stopford Brooke, Anglican clergyman and writer (died 1916 in England).

Full date unknown
Patrick Carlin, Victoria Cross soldier, recipient of the Victoria Cross for gallantry in 1858 in India (died 1895).
Thomas McCarthy, businessman and politician in Quebec (died 1870 in Canada).
Standish Hayes O'Grady, antiquarian (died 1915 in England).
Joseph Ward, recipient of the Victoria Cross for gallantry in 1858 at Gwalior, India (died 1872).

Deaths
8 April – Andrew Blayney, 11th Baron Blayney, soldier, politician and peer (born 1770).
18 September – Henry Boyd, literary translator.
28 December – Henry Conyngham, 1st Marquess Conyngham, politician (born 1766).

References

 
1830s in Ireland
Ireland
Years of the 19th century in Ireland